Punta Torre Canne Lighthouse is an active lighthouse in the homonymous village in the municipality of Fasano. The place takes the name from an ancient coastal tower built in the 16th century to protect the coast from the Turks, and from the presence of giant cane.

Description
The lighthouse was built in 1929 in concrete and has a tapered octagonal prism with balcony and lantern attached to 1-storey keeper's house; the tower and the building are white painted. The light is fully automated and managed by Marina Militare identified by the Country code number 3688 E.F.

See also
List of lighthouses in Italy
Fasano

References

External links 

 Servizio Fari Marina Militare 

Lighthouses in Italy
Fasano